Geissler or Geißler may refer to:

Persons
 Ernst Geissler, German and American aerospace engineer
 Fritz Geißler, German composer
 Heiner Geißler, (1930–2017), German politician (CDU)
 Ines Geißler, German swimmer
 Heinrich Geißler, German physicist
 Martin Geissler, Scottish news reporter
 Siegfried Geißler (1929–2014), German composer, conductor, hornist and politician
 Sina-Aline Geißler, German writer and journalist
 William Geissler, Scottish painter

Others
 Geissler (crater), lunar crater named for Heinrich Geißler
 Geißler (Lauer), river in Bavaria, Germany

See also
Geisler
Geiszler